Paula  is a 2016 German biographical film directed by Christian Schwochow. The film depicts pioneering female painter Paula Modersohn-Becker.

Cast 
 Carla Juri - Paula Modersohn-Becker
 Albrecht Schuch - Otto Modersohn
 Roxane Duran - Clara Westhoff
 Joel Basman - Rainer Maria Rilke
 Stanley Weber - Georges
  - Hans am Ende
  - Fritz Mackensen

References

External links 
 
 

2016 biographical drama films
German biographical drama films
Biographical films about painters
Films set in 1890
Films set in 1900
2016 drama films
Films directed by Christian Schwochow
2010s German films